Raúl Araiza (1 September 1935 – 8 January 2013) was a Mexican director, actor and producer

Filmography

Awards and nominations

References

External links

1935 births
2013 deaths
Deaths from cancer in Mexico
Deaths from pancreatic cancer
Mexican male telenovela actors
Mexican male television actors
Mexican telenovela directors
Mexican television directors
Mexican telenovela producers
Male actors from Veracruz
20th-century Mexican male actors
21st-century Mexican male actors
People from Minatitlán, Veracruz